PCGM may refer to:

 Political correctness gone mad
 Preconditioned conjugate gradient method
 Pacific Coast Gravity Meeting